is a subway station on the Toei Ōedo Line in Shinjuku, Tokyo, Japan, operated by the Tokyo subway operator Toei Subway.

Lines
Tochōmae Station is served by the Toei Ōedo Line, and is numbered "E-28".

Station layout
The station consists of two island platforms on the 3rd basement ("3BF") level, serving four tracks. There are seven exits from the station, numbered A1 to A7.

Platforms

History
The station opened on December 19, 1997.

Surrounding area
 Nishi-shinjuku Station (Tokyo Metro Marunouchi Line)
 Shinjuku Central Park
 Kogakuin University
 Tokyo Medical University Hospital

Office buildings
 Tokyo Metropolitan Government Building
 Shinjuku Mitsui Building
 Shinjuku Sumitomo Building
 Shinjuku Center Building
 Shinjuku Monolith Building
 Shinjuku NS Building

Hotels
 Keio Plaza Hotel
 Hyatt Regency Tokyo
 Hilton Tokyo
 Washington Hotel

References

External links

 Tochomae Station information (Toei) 

Railway stations in Japan opened in 1997
Toei Ōedo Line
Stations of Tokyo Metropolitan Bureau of Transportation
Railway stations in Tokyo